The 3rd Open Russian Festival of Animated Film was held in from February 5–9 in 1998 at a boarding house called "Birch Grove" two kilometres from the town of Tarusa, Russia.  Animated works from the past three years from the Russian Federation were accepted.

The prizes were handed out according to profession, and any member or guest of the festival was able to vote for their favourite film.

Jury

Prizes of the Jury

Rating (by audience vote)

External links
Full list of submissions (some can be watched online)
Official website with the results

Open Russian Festival of Animated Film
Open Russian Festival of Animated Film
1998 in animation
Russ
Russ
Russ